|}

This is a list of electoral district results of the 2005 Western Australian election.

Results by Electoral district

Albany

Alfred Cove

Armadale

Avon

Balcatta

Ballajura

Bassendean

Belmont

Bunbury

Capel

Carine

Central Kimberley-Pilbara

Churchlands

Cockburn

Collie-Wellington

Cottesloe

Darling Range

Dawesville

Fremantle

Geraldton

Girrawheen

Greenough

Hillarys

Joondalup

Kalgoorlie

Kenwick

Kimberley

Kingsley

Leschenault

Mandurah

Maylands

Merredin

Midland

Mindarie

Moore

Murchison-Eyre

Murdoch

Murray

Nedlands

North West Coastal

Peel

Perth

Riverton

Rockingham

Roe

Serpentine-Jarrahdale

South Perth

Southern River

Stirling

Swan Hills

Vasse

Victoria Park

Wagin

Wanneroo

Warren-Blackwood

Willagee

Yokine

See also 

 Results of the Western Australian state election, 2005 (Legislative Council)
 2005 Western Australian state election
 Candidates of the Western Australian state election, 2005
 Members of the Western Australian Legislative Assembly, 2005–2008

References 

Results of Western Australian elections
2005 elections in Australia